Natalia Munteanu (born 1 December 1993) is a Moldovan footballer who plays as a goalkeeper for Belarusian Premier League club Dinamo-BGU and the Moldova women's national team.

Career
Munteanu has been capped for the Moldova national team, appearing for the team during the 2019 FIFA Women's World Cup qualifying cycle.

See also
List of Moldova women's international footballers

References

External links
 
 
 

1993 births
Living people
Women's association football goalkeepers
Moldovan women's footballers
People from Ungheni
Moldova women's international footballers
Moldovan expatriate women's footballers
Moldovan expatriate sportspeople in Belarus
Expatriate women's footballers in Belarus